Nugent is the seventh studio album by American hard rock musician Ted Nugent. The album was released in August 1982 by Atlantic Records.

Reception 

John Franck of AllMusic was dismissive of Nugent, commenting that although the record had "a strong start", things "quickly deteriorate[d]", describing the rest of the album as "mediocre [...] to the just plain awful."

Track listing
All songs written and arranged by Ted Nugent.

Personnel
Band members
Ted Nugent – guitars, six string bass, lead vocals, producer, mixing
Derek St. Holmes – lead vocals on tracks 1, 3, 5, 6, 8 & 10, rhythm guitar
Dave Kiswiney – bass guitar, backing vocals
Carmine Appice – drums, backing vocals

Additional musicians
Donnie Backus – piano on "Can't Stop Me Now"
Randy Bishop, Bart Bishop, Jude Cole, Mark Gerhardt, Shawn Murphy, Rick Wagoner, Kurt Wagoner, Verne Wagoner – backing vocals

Production
David McCullough – assistant producer, mixing
Larry Brown – engineer, mixing
Al Hurschman, Dee Hurschman, Csaba Petocz, Mike Sanders, Tim Clark – assistant engineers
Bernie Grundman – mastering
Eric Conn – digital remastering

Charts

References

1982 albums
Ted Nugent albums
Atlantic Records albums
Albums produced by Ted Nugent